2 Aurigae is a possible binary star system in the northern constellation of Auriga. This object is visible to the naked eye as a faint, orange-hued star with an apparent visual magnitude of +4.79. It forms an attractive four-star asterism when viewed in a low power eyepiece, together with the nearby HIP 22647 and another very loose visual pair, HIP 22776 and HIP 22744, all above magnitude 8. 2 Aurigae is moving closer to the Earth with a heliocentric radial velocity of −17 km/s.

The suffix notation indicates this is a mild barium star, which means the stellar atmosphere is enriched with s-process elements. It is either a member of a close binary system and has previously acquired these elements from a (now) white dwarf companion or else it is on the asymptotic giant branch and is generating the elements itself. 2 Aurigae is 1.80 billion years old with 2.86 times the mass of the Sun and has expanded to 48 times the Sun's radius. It is radiating 599 times the Sun's luminosity from its enlarged photosphere at an effective temperature of 4,115 K.

References

External links
 HR 1551
 Image 2 Aurigae

K-type giants
Barium stars
Binary stars
Auriga (constellation)
Durchmusterung objects
Aurigae, 02
030834
022678
1551